Sterling is a town in Worcester County, Massachusetts, USA.  The population was 7,985 at the 2020 census.

History 
Sterling was first settled by Europeans in 1720 and was officially incorporated in 1781.

Previous to its incorporation it was "the Second Parish of Lancaster," and was commonly called by a portion of its Indian name, Chocksett. The Nipmuc minister, Peter Jethro, worked in the area in the 1670s. The original Indian name of the area being Woonsechocksett. The land encompassing the Chocksett region was not originally included in the first land sold by the great Indian Chief Sholan to the settlers of the Lancaster grant. However, Sholan's nephew Tahanto would eventually sell the Chocksett land to inhabitants of Lancaster in 1713.

The first white settlers arrived in Chocksett seven years later in 1720, formerly inhabitants of Lancaster proper. Among these first settlers were families such as Beman, Sawyer, Houghton, and Osgood; names reflected to this day in the names of Sterling's oldest roads.

A short time after settlement, in 1733, the residents of the Chocksett area requested its own incorporation, separate from Lancaster, due to the "great inconvenience" of a long distance to the church in Lancaster's center. This request was denied. However, by 1780 the population of Chocksett was so numerous as to constitute a majority, and so the voters of the area voted out the existing Lancaster town officers and began to conduct town business and meetings in Chocksett. This was enough to convince the rest of Lancaster that it was now time for Chocksett, the Second Parish of Lancaster, to go its own way.

In 1781, Chocksett was incorporated as its own town: Sterling. The town derives its name from General William "Lord Stirling" Alexander, who served valiantly under Gen. George Washington in the New York and other campaigns. His portrait hangs in the town hall, and the town commemorated Alexander with a medallion during its bicentennial celebration in 1976. A duplicate portrait resides in the town hall of New Windsor, NY.

Residents recently approved and built new facilities for the police and fire departments.

Geography

Interstate 190 cuts Sterling in half. Sterling is also crossed by Massachusetts Route 12, Massachusetts Route 62, Massachusetts Route 140, and Massachusetts Route 110.

Sterling is bordered by Leominster to the north, West Boylston to the south, Princeton and Holden to the west, Lancaster to the northeast, and Clinton and Boylston to the southeast.  Sterling borders Boylston on the Wachusett Reservoir.

Demographics

As of the census of 2000, there were 7,257 people, 2,573 households, and 2,068 families residing in the town. The racial makeup of the town was 98.06% White, 0.58% African American, 0.10% Native American, 0.40% Asian, 0.01% Pacific Islander, 0.28% from other races, and 0.58% from two or more races. Hispanic or Latino of any race were 0.81% of the population.

There were 2,573 households, out of which 39.9% had children under the age of 18 living with them, 69.8% were married couples living together, 7.3% had a female householder with no husband present, and 19.6% were non-families. 15.3% of all households were made up of individuals, and 6.1% had someone living alone who was 65 years of age or older.  The average household size was 2.82 and the average family size was 3.16.

In the town, the population was spread out, with 27.5% under the age of 18, 5.6% from 18 to 24, 30.7% from 25 to 44, 27.1% from 45 to 64, and 9.0% who were 65 years of age or older.  The median age was 38 years. For every 100 females, there were 99.1 males.  For every 100 females age 18 and over, there were 95.1 males.

The median income for a household in the town was $67,188, and the median income for a family was $76,943. Males had a median income of $51,227 versus $32,734 for females. The per capita income for the town was $28,844.  About 1.7% of families and 2.9% of the population were below the poverty line, including 4.5% of those under age 18 and 5.7% of those age 65 or over.

Government

Taxes
The tax rate in Sterling has remained fairly steady over recent years and has occasionally been reduced by a small percentage. These small decreases however have been dramatically overshadowed by extreme increases in house evaluations resulting in many residents effectively paying 50–75% more in taxes in 2005 as compared with five years earlier.

The Waushacum Village Homeowner's Association, however, being a private neighborhood southeast of the Sterling Junction, employs a system in which the land is leased from the neighborhood committee, which creates low house valuations in the area.

The Waushacum Village Homeowner's Association is also the only neighborhood in Sterling that operates a unified sewage and waste management system.

Library

The Sterling public library began in 1871. The Conant Public Library building, financed by Edwin Conant in memory of his daughter Elizabeth Ann Conant, was dedicated in 1886. In fiscal year 2008, the town of Sterling spent 1.59% ($289,567) of its budget on its public library—approximately $36 per person, per year ($47.44 adjusted for inflation to 2022). The Conant Library building closed in 2002 so it could be renovated. During this time, the library was temporarily moved to the Old Town Hall. The renovation was finished in 2004, and the library returned to its original location.

Education

Sterling is part of the Wachusett Regional School District. Students between Grades K–4 attend Houghton Elementary School while students between Grades 5–8 attend Chocksett Middle School. Most Sterling residents attend Wachusett Regional High School in Holden  for high school. Some Sterling residents however can attend Montachusett Regional Vocational Technical School in Fitchburg.

Private Schools
 Applewild School, established in 1957; a private, independent co-educational day school for grades Pre-K–8 located in Fitchburg, MA.

Utilities

Sterling provides town water to many residents although the more rural parts of town remain on private wells. The quality of the town water is high after the installation of a purification system. The water is drawn from a private underground spring which flows from the Chickopee Water Table. In the early 2000s town water supply was affected by high bacteria levels and residents were forced to boil water for three weeks until the situation was resolved. With the exception of the Waushacum Home Owner's Association (whose residents enjoy a private purification system) there are no town sewer services—all houses have private septic systems.

The town also offers curbside trash and recycling pickup for no additional fee. The town recycling center at the Sterling Department of Public Works closed permanently on July 1, 2015.  Residents may use the Wachusett Watershed Regional Recycling Center in West Boylston, MA to drop off recycling and larger bulk items.

Sterling is one of 38 or so communities in the state that has its own municipal electric light company that is separate from other municipal government functions. Sterling ratepayers are the owners of this utility and reap the benefits of exceptional service and an early payment discount on their monthly bills. The Light Dept works under the direction and control of three elected Commissioners who serve rotating 3 year terms. The Light Board hires a Manager who runs day-to-day operations. In May 2013, the Light Board began the process of expanding to establish a Municipal Gas Company to bring natural gas service to town.

In fall of 2016, Sterling Municipal Light Department broke ground on the "first utility-scale energy storage facility in Massachusetts", which can, in the case of an electric outage, power the emergency dispatch center and police station for up to twelve days. The battery storage also helps the town save money on peak power charges from the grid operator. The award-winning project has generated considerable interest, attracting international visitors from Europe and Asia. In the aftermath of the devastating 2017 hurricanes Irma and Maria in the Caribbean, the microgrid project has been cited as a model of designing and building power infrastructure for resiliency in disaster situations.

Points of interest
An annual event, the Sterling Fair, is typically held in early to mid-September. The Sterling Fair is one of the last remaining agricultural fairs with free admission. In addition to traditional livestock exhibits including goats, cows, rabbits and sheep, the fair has carnival games and rides, as well as patron-submitted exhibits and art works, a petting zoo, contests, oxen pulls, a pancake breakfast held by the Sterling Chocksett Club, live music performances, food, and fireworks.

Close proximity to Wachusett Mountain (state forest and ski area) and Leominster State Forest.

Davis Farmland, a seasonal petting zoo for children and Davis Mega Maze, New England's only world class adventure cornfield maze.

Sholan Park located on Lake Waushacum has a beach area with a dock for swimming. It also has grills for cookouts, a sand volleyball court, and a boat ramp.

Notable people

 Ebenezer Butterick (1826–1903), inventor of tissue paper dress patterns, which revolutionized home sewing.  The town's municipal building is located in the old Butterick School, which was named after Ebenezer Butterick's daughter, Mary Ellen
 Edwin Conant, Businessman, Attorney, Philanthropist
 Charles Herbert Colvin, aeronautical engineer
 Jay Cutler, bodybuilder and four-time Mr. Olympia
 Prentiss Mellen, United States senator (1818–1820)
 William Francis Nichols, Arizona Territorial Secretary
 Le Gage Pratt, U.S. Representative from New Jersey
 Arthur Prentice Rugg Chief Justice, Massachusetts Supreme Court
 Mary Sawyer Tyler, the alleged real-life "Mary" of the poem "Mary Had a Little Lamb"

Film and literary references
The 2001 film Shallow Hal had scenes shot in Sterling.
Sterling is the setting of Sarah Josepha Hale's poem "Mary Had a Little Lamb". Mary Sawyer, the alleged real-life subject of the poem, lived in Sterling and attended the Redstone School. The Sawyers' house was a National Historic Place until it was destroyed by arson in August 2007. A new replica of the house has been created.

See also
 Sterling Camp Meeting Grounds, a former Methodist Camp Meeting site

References

External links

Sterling official website
Sterling Historical Society official website
History of Sterling Massachusetts: Images, photos and postcards from the past

 
Towns in Worcester County, Massachusetts
Towns in Massachusetts